The Kulu Vase is the name of an ancient Buddhist bronze goblet found in the foothills of the Himalayas during the mid-19th century. The importance of the vase lies in the fact that it is one of the oldest metal objects to be decorated in this fashion on the Indian Subcontinent.  Since 1880, the vase has been part of the British Museum's Asian collection.

Discovery
Although originally thought to come from Kulu, the vase was discovered in 1857 near the Gandhola Monastery, about 18 km from Keylong in Lahaul, Himachal Pradesh. A landslip had exposed an ancient Buddhist cell which had been lying dormant for over 1,500 years. The vase was eventually acquired by Major Hay, the local political agent of the British Raj, who donated it to the India Museum in London. In 1880 the vase, like many other items in the India Museum, was transferred to the British Museum.

Description
The Kulu Vase is spherical in shape with a high neck and wide rim which is partly damaged. The frieze on the vase illustrates a courtly figure or monarch who heads a chariot procession. Bestriding a chariot pulled by four horses, he is closely followed by a line of cavalry and another royal personage riding an elephant. At the end of the procession two female musicians are playing a flute and harp. The neck of the vase is decorated with a range of different patterns including chevrons and parallel lines. Without any inscriptions or local context to the find, it is difficult to determine the significance and meaning of the characters and ceremony portrayed on the vase.

Gallery

Further reading
E A Knox, Enlightening the Kulu Vase: a tour through peninsular enlightenment iconography in the early Buddhist period
V Elisseeff (editor), The Silk Roads: Highways of Culture and Commerce

References

Asian objects in the British Museum
Archaeology of India
Buddhist art